Mark Ayotte (born March 12, 1964 in Ishpeming, Michigan) is a professional basketball referee in the National Basketball Association. He wears the uniform number 56. He has refereed 741 regular season and three playoff games. Prior to joining the NBA, he was an official with the WNBA and the CBA.

References

External links 
 Mark Ayotte - National Basketball Referees Association

1964 births
Living people
People from Ishpeming, Michigan
People from Negaunee, Michigan
National Basketball Association referees
Michigan Technological University alumni
Continental Basketball Association referees
Basketball people from Michigan